The Sun of St. Moritz (German: Die Sonne von St. Moritz) is a 1923 German silent drama film directed by Hubert Moest and Friedrich Weissenberg and starring Hedda Vernon and Grete Diercks. The film is based on a novel by Paul Oskar Höcker, and was remade in 1954 as The Sun of St. Moritz.

The film's art direction was by Fritz Lederer.

Cast
In alphabetical order

References

External links

Films of the Weimar Republic
Films directed by Hubert Moest
German silent feature films
German black-and-white films